Tobolsk Viceroyalty   was an administrative-territorial formation - namestnichestvo on the territory of Siberia of the Russian Empire from 1782 to 1796. The seat of the Viceroyalty was located in Tobolsk.

History 
Established by personal decree of Catherine II from the territory of the  dissolved Tobolsk province.

In 1780 - 1782 in Tobolsk, on the site of the old clerk's chamber, built by Semyon Ulyanovich Remezov, on a high ravine between the Pryamsky vzvoz and the banks of the Irtysh, a 3-storey stone Tobolsk Viceroy's palace was rebuilt. In its spacious Throne Room, decorated with expensive carpets, there was the Imperial throne decorated with gold, from the steps of which the Tobolsk rulers received officials and foreign ambassadors.

The Khan of the middle Kirghiz horde with the sultans, the Vogul ancestors, Prince Taishin of Principality of Obdorsk and other Ostyak princes were invited and arrived in Tobolsk in August 1782 for solemn events dedicated to the opening of the Tobolsk Viceroyalty.

Celebrations in Tobolsk began on August 21, 1782. On the eve of this day, Major Yakov Meibom, who was appointed mayor, second-major, and collegiate secretary Matvey Yurlov, with 6 horse trumpeters and 12 hussars, informed Tobolyakov and guests of the city about the upcoming festivities. At 4 o'clock in the morning, after a cannon shot, a military team of 1,000 people arrived at the Tobolsk Kremlin. At 7 o'clock in the morning, also after a cannon shot, commanding officials began to arrive at the Viceroy's Palace of the Governor General, Lieutenant General of the Life Guards and Prime Major Yevgeny Petrovich Kashkin. By cannon shot at 8 o'clock in the morning, the church service of Varlaam Archbishop of Tobolsk and Siberia began, which was attended by all officials. They arrived at the Chathedral from the Viceroy's Palace  in a special procession along a special platform upholstered in scarlet cloth. During the prayer service "there was cannon firing from 101 cannons and two rapid fires." This was followed in turn by a celebratory dinner, an evening ball, and a supper after midnight.

On August 23, 1782, a dinner was given in the Throne room of the Tobolsk Viceroy's Palace.

On August 30, 1782, the opening of the Tobolsk Viceroyalty took place. According to the description of Abramov N.A., from the words of a participant in these celebrations: “At the end of the Divine Liturgy and a prayer service, a procession with holy icons was made from the cathedral to the Tobolsk Viceroy's palace. Upon arrival at the palace, a prayer service was served on the occasion of the opening of the Offices. And after pronouncing many years to the Empress and the entire August House, cannon were fired. The food for the people was plentiful. There were whole roasted bulls with gilded horns, various edible preparations were put inside the bulls. Barrels of plain wine and beer were installed. Fountains were arranged, from which grape wine was poured into the framed barrels. Everywhere there was expanse and fun. At night, the city was gracefully lit. A magnificent illumination was arranged, shining with different colors of lights, at the Tobolsk Viceroy's palace, where a majestic picture depicting Empress Catherine II was installed. Description of the celebrations, possibly belongs to Pyotr Slovtsov, who, being a 15-year-old student of the Tobolsk Theological Seminary, read the ode "To Siberia" of his own composition at the celebrations from the seminary.

In 1785, the Tobolsk  Viceroyalty consisted of two regions: Tobolsk Oblast and Tomsk Oblast.

Oblast (regions) were intermediate links of administrative-territorial administration between the namestnichestvo (vicegerency) and the uezd (county), by this, the Catherine II 's administration adapted the system of government to the vast Siberian territories.

The Tobolsk Oblast included 10 uezds: Beryozovsky Uezd, Ishimsky Uezd, Kurgansky Uezd, Omsky Uezd, Surgutsky Uezd, Tarsky Uezd,Tobolsky Uezd, Turinsky Uezd, Tyumensky Uezd, Yalturovsky Uezd; the uezdless town of Pelym (Turinsky Uezd); 11 fortresses that make up the Ishim line (southern border of Kurgansky Uezd, Ishimsky Uezd and Omsky Uezd).

The structure of the Tomsk Oblast included 6 uezds: Achinsky Uezd, Yeniseisk Uezd, Kainsky Uezd, Narymsky Uezd, Tomsk Uezd, Turukhansky Uezd.

The following cities were re-established in the Tobolsk Oblast: Omsk  - from the Omsk fortress, Ishim - from the Korkina settlement, Kurgan - from the Kurgan settlement (Tsarevo Gorodishe settlement), Yalutorovsk - from the Yalutorovsky ostrog.

In 1788 - early 1790s, general city dumas were organized in nine cities of the Tobolsk Viceroyalty: Tobolsk, Tomsk, Tyumen, Tara, Turukhansk, Yeniseisk, Narym and Omsk. To be considered a city, the population had to have a special letter from the empress Catherine II, which created a self-governing city society with the right of a legal entity, as well as the highest approved coat of arms  and city plan according to Catherine II regional reform in 1785 of the transformation of provincial government in viceroyalties.

The management of the Tobolsk Viceroyalty  was united with that of Perm Viceroyalty under the authority of the governor-general, in whose hands all the threads of economic, police and judicial administration were concentrated. He had full administrative and military power in the territory entrusted to him. E. P. Kashkin was appointed the first governor-general of Perm Viceroyalty and Tobolsk Viceroyalty.

The Tobolsk Viceroyalty belonged to the I category (status, depending on which monetary payments were assigned to officials who served in them), uniting territories that had a more standardized administration.

The Tobolsk Viceroyalty had an area of 5 million square  verst. There were 16 cities, 16 ostrogs and suburbs, 42 pogosts, 43 slobodas, 124 villages, 10 fortresses, 5 monasteries, 18 outposts, camps and redoubts, 2994 villages and winter quarters, 1232 auls and yurts of non-Christians, 72 landowners' lodges, 6 state-owned and 14 private manufacturing establishments. In the vicegerency, 224 volosts of Russian settlers and 156 volosts of other faiths  were organized.

In 1796, the Tobolsk Viceroyalty was abolished by Paul I. The territory of the Viceroyalty was transferred to the newly formed Tobolsk Governorate.

Population 
The population of the Tobolsk Viceroyalty was represented by the following national and ethnic groups: Russians, Tatars, Сhuvalshchiki quitrents (Сhuvalshchiki - Muslim settlers from other provinces, recorded as settled foreigners and endowed with land in the amount of 15 dessiatins ), Bukharians, Ostyaks, Voguls, Samoyeds, Tungus, Chapogirs (one of the Yenisei clans of Tungus) and Yakuts.

Economy 
1783 crop failure in the Tobolsk Viceroyalty.

See also 

List of viceroyalties of the Russian Empire
Viceroy of Russian Empire

References 

1782 establishments in the Russian Empire
History of Sverdlovsk Oblast
Viceroyalties of the Russian Empire
History of Siberia